Two submarines of the Turkish Navy have borne the name TCG Hızırreis; both were former US Navy vessels:

 TCG Hızırreis (S344), ex , transferred on loan under the Military Assistance Program to Turkey on 20 April 1960. Sold outright to Turkey, 1 August 1973. Disposed of in 1980.

 TCG Hızırreis (S342), ex , leased to Turkey on 21 March 1980, sold on 6 August 1987, and decommissioned in 31 January 2004.

Turkish Navy ship names